Hassab's decongestion operation is an elective surgical procedure to treat esophageal varices in patients with portal hypertension as a result of cirrhosis of the liver. It was created by Dr. Mohammed Aboul-Fotouh Hassab, a professor of surgery at Alexandria University in Egypt.


Procedure
The approach is abdominal.
 Splenectomy
 Devascularization of the distal 7 cm of the esophagus
 Devascularization of the proximal part of the stomach
 Vagotomy and pyeloroplasty

References
 

Digestive system surgery